Talene Monahon is an American actress and playwright.

Childhood and education

Monahon grew up in Belmont, Massachusetts. She is a 2013 graduate of Dartmouth College.

Monahon was a child actor in regional and amateur productions in the Boston area.

How to Load a Musket
How to Load a Musket, Monahon's play about historical reenactment, was produced as a staged reading at the Cape Cod Theatre Project in 2017, and had its premier production at Manhattan's 59E59 Theaters in January 2020.

Monahon began researching historical reenactment in 2015, first interviewing Revolutionary War reenacters in Massachusetts and New York, then interviewing Civil War reenacters and performance artist Dread Scott, who produced a 2017 reenactment of the 1811 German Coast uprising. Monahon's play is created entirely from the words of her politically, ethnically and socioeconomically diverse interviewees, whose views of their hobby evolve over the years during which the interviews took place.

Acting
Monahon has performed on stage in New York and other cities.  New York Times theater critic Laura Collins-Hughes describes Monahon as playing Blanche Sartorious in George Bernard Shaw's Widower's Houses "with such take-no-prisoners ferocity that she awakened the sleeping man in front of me during a fight scene." Terry Teachout, theater critic for the Wall Street Journal, described Monahon's as playing Blanche as, "a startlingly predatory vampire," in a production of Shaw's work that was "as good as it gets."

Monahon has a handful of television acting credits, most recently appearing as Assistant District Attorney Conway in the CBS legal drama Bull.

References

Living people
21st-century American dramatists and playwrights
American stage actresses
People from Belmont, Massachusetts
Dartmouth College alumni
Year of birth missing (living people)
21st-century American actresses
21st-century American women writers
American women dramatists and playwrights
Writers from Massachusetts
Actresses from Massachusetts
American television actresses